Bryden Hill is a mountain located in the Catskill Mountains of New York northeast of Downsville. Conklin Hill is located south, and Renard Hill is located southwest of Bryden Hill.

References

Mountains of Delaware County, New York
Mountains of New York (state)